Innerpeffray Collegiate Church is an ancient church building in Innerpeffray, Perth and Kinross, Scotland. Dating to 1508, it is now a scheduled monument.

See also
Scheduled monuments in Perth and Kinross

References

Scheduled Ancient Monuments in Perth and Kinross
Churches completed in 1506
Churches in Perth and Kinross
Listed churches in Scotland